Dave Kane (born in Bangor, County Down, Northern Ireland) is a Double Bass player, composer and band leader.

Beginnings
Kane purchased an electric bass guitar from a local catholic priest for £50 when he was 16 years old. He then began playing in local punk and alternative bands.

Education
North Down College with composer and bandleader Brian Irvine.
Bretton Hall College of the University of Leeds where he immersed himself in the music of John Cage, Edgar Varese, Cecil Taylor, Barry Guy, John Coltrane, Iannis Xenakis, Charles Mingus, Frank Zappa and John Zorn.

Career
Kane has played with British Jazz legends including; Evan Parker, Keith Tippett, Paul Dunmall, Elton Dean, Tony Levin, Mark Sanders, Alex Maguire, Paul Rogers and many others.

Currently based in Leeds, Kane is a founder member of L.I.M.A. (Leeds improvised music association) and musical director/ composer for the L.I.M.A orchestra. Other projects include: The internationally acclaimed Bourne/Davis/Kane; Dave Kane’s Rabbit Project; and a duo with Alex Bonney.

Discography

Dave Kane's Rabbit Project
 The Eye Of The Duck (27 April June 2009) Edition Records EDN1012

Bourne/Davis/Kane
 Lost Something (August 2008) Edition Records EDN1003

Bourne/Davis/Kane with Paul Dunmall
 Moment To Moment

Reviews of recorded work
 Review of "Dave Kane's Rabbit Project: The Eye of the Duck", The Jazzman, 30 April 2009.
  Review of "Dave Kane's Rabbit Project: The Eye of the Duck", The Guardian, 29 May 2009.
  Review of "Dave Kane's Rabbit Project: The Eye of the Duck", The Vortex Jazz Club 2009.
  Review of "Lost Something", The Independent, 24 August 2008.
 Review of "Lost Something", The Guardian, 12 September 2008.

External links
Dave Kane's official website
Dave Kane's MySpace page
Dave Kane and Alex Bonney Interview with Jazzwise

Musicians from County Down
Living people
People from Bangor, County Down
Year of birth missing (living people)
Edition Records artists